The 2009 Ashbourne Cup inter-collegiate camogie championship was staged in Cork over the weekend of February 21–22. It was won by Waterford Institute of Technology who defeated the hosts UCC in Saturday's semi-final in The Mardyke before denying University College Dublin the three-in-a-row in the final by three points in Páirc Uí Rinn 24 hours later. Player of the tournament was WIT's Stacey Redmond.

The Final
Waterford's victory was inspired by a fifth-minute goal on five minutes from Mullinavat's Michelle Quilty who combined effectively with Wexford duo Stacey Redmond and Ursula Jacob to shoot past Wexford inter-county team-mate Mags Darcy. Waterford led 1–6 to 0–1 at half-time. UCD came back in the second half when they had the breeze with strong performances from Wexford's Mary Leacy and Cork's Rena Buckley but their goal from another Wexford inter-county player Una Leacy 10 minutes from the end was not enough.

Shield
Galway's Lorraine Ryan scored 1–8 of NUIG's total in a 1–14 to 2–10 victory over University of Limerick. Edel Maher and Maire O'Neill scored first half goals for Limerick who led 2–7 to 0–4 at half time.

Results

Match Rules
60 minutes
Extra Time if scores level
Maximum of 5 substitutions

References

External links
 History of the Ashbourne and Purcell Cups on camogie.ie
 Official Camogie Website
 On The Ball Official Camogie Magazine
 College websites Queens University Belfast  University College Dublin

Ashbourne Cup
Ashbourne Cup